Ábalos is a municipality in the autonomous region of La Rioja, Spain. Located in Rioja Alta, on the left bank of the river Ebro, near Haro. It is bounded on the north by the Toloño mountains, on the south by San Asensio and Baños de Ebro, on the east by Samaniego and Villabuena de Álava, and to the west by San Vicente de la Sonsierra.

History
In the Albeldense Chronicle the famous expedition conducted by Alfonso I, king of Asturias along the banks of the Ebro in 740 is mentioned. At that time, Ábalos was a part, as most of the mainland, of the Muslim kingdom of Córdoba. This account refers to the destroyed towns: Mirandam (now Miranda de Ebro), Revendecam, Carbonariam, Abeicam (Ábalos, from where he crossed the Ebro), Brunes (could be Briones but this is uncertain), Cinissariam (now Cenicero) and Alesanco. Control of the area then returned to Muslim hands until its final conquest in the late ninth and early tenth century.

In the eleventh and twelfth centuries the village is mentioned several times in the documents of the San Millán Monastery. Among them, as recorded by the Bishop Sandoval, the donation of the church of San Felix to the Monastery of San Millán, made by Gonzalo Núñez de Lara and his wife Goto Núñez in 1084.

In the fifteenth century it is known that Ábalos was village of San Vicente de la Sonsierra, whose lordship boasted different personages: Pedro Velasco, Pedro Girón, Juliana Aragón, Bernardino Velasco, etc. always due to numerous setbacks such as donations of gratitude, direct sales or inheritance.

In 1397 Charles III of Navarre granted Rui Lopez de Dábalos the town with all its land and royal rights except the sovereignty and appeal to the court of the King.

Ábalos was a village of San Vicente de la Sonsierra, whose lordship was donated by John II of Navarre in 1430 to General Pedro Fernandez de Velasco II, the property then going on to be supervised by different lineages, either through donations, wills, acknowledgments or sale, including Pedro Girón, Juliana Aragón, Bernardino Fernandez de Velasco until it fell on Juan Hurtado de Velasco, Count of Castilnovo, who authorized on July 5, 1653 the separation of the town of San Vicente, on payment of 449,800 maravedis.

Ábalos, however, continued to belong to the Lordship of San Vicente until 1727, when, as a result of debts incurred by the Counts of Castilnovo, gentlemen of the time, the estate was put on auction by the Tribunal of the Inquisition of Logrono, being awarded to the neighbors who bid up to 53,500 maravedis. Since then Ábalos is an independent town.

Abolos > Avolos (alpha, beta, omicron, lambda, omicron, sigma) means "awkward" in Greek, may have some connection as Greeks did found the ancient Greek city of Emborio is Spain. Also Bolikos >Volikos (beta, omicron, lambda, iota, kappa, omicron, sigma) is the antonym.

Demography

As of 1 January 2010 the population was 369 inhabitants, 231 men and 138 women.

Etymology
In an 1199 bull, through which privileges were granted to the San Millán de la Cogolla monastery, the name Dáualos appeared. This name, according to Ortiz Trifol, was related to Abalasqueta, the Basque, or rather it was the accusative plural of the anthroponym of the second declension of Abaris, perhaps taking into account the identification between the Varduli city of Thabuca and Avalos, indicates . Most likely it is related to the anthroponym, which would suggest an "Avalos or Davalos" village.

Politics
In 2007, the Popular Party (PP) claimed victory in the municipal elections of the Abalos City council winning four seats to the Spanish Socialist Workers Party (PSOE)'s three.

Up to that time, the city government had fallen into the hands of the Socialists, who have always had three or four councillors since 1979. The Union of the Democratic Centre (Spain) (UCD) or independent candidates got some councillors in different elections, while the PP, meanwhile, did not contest the elections between 1979 and 1991.

Tourism

Buildings and monuments

St. Stephen Protomartyr Parish Church

The Iglesia Parroquial de San Esteban Protomártir (: St. Stephen Protomartyr Parish Church) was declared an asset of Cultural Interest in the category of Monument on September 28, 1983. Its flamboyant gothic style was built in the sixteenth century. It has a single nave divided into three sections and a crown. The tower is baroque, built between 1735 and 1740. The altarpiece, located in the presbytery, dates back to the mid sixteenth century and is attributed to the workshop of the Beaugrant family.

Other items of note are:
 The tomb of Francisco Antonio Ramirez de la Piscina, Baroque from the first half of the eighteenth century.
 Image of the Virgin of the Rose, sixteenth-century Gothic.
 Seating in the choir loft, the beginning of the same century.

Hermitages
The San Felices Hermitage
The San Felices Hermitage is located in an open field to the northeast of Ábalos. It is Romanesque and it seems that the chapel is the only remnant of a monastery which, in the twelfth century, already belonged to San Millán. Built in ashlar stone, it has a triumphal arch and two portals. There are anthropomorphic graves nearby.

San Roque Hermitage

San Bartolomé Hermitage

La Virgen de la Rosa Hermitage

The Virrey de Nápoles house
Popularly known by this name (: la casa del Virrey de Nápoles), alluding to the Viceroyalty of Naples.

The house of the Canton or of Ramírez de la Piscina 
Made of ashlar stone. It bears the shields of Ramirez de la Piscina and López de Ornillos.

Notable people
 José Fermín Gurbindo
 Francisco Antonio Ramírez de la Piscina
 Martín Fernández de Navarrete y Jiménez de Tejada

References

Municipalities in La Rioja (Spain)